Zelotomys is a genus of rodents in the subfamily Murinae, the Old World rats and mice. They are known commonly as the broad-headed mice.  They are native to Africa.

There are two species.

Species
Zelotomys hildegardeae – Hildegarde's broad-headed mouse
Zelotomys woosnami – Woosnam's broad-headed mouse

References

 
Rodent genera
Taxa named by Wilfred Hudson Osgood